Fahan School is an independent school for girls located in Sandy Bay, a suburb of Hobart, Tasmania, Australia. It is a non-denominational school with a Christian ethos.

The School was established in 1935 by Isobel Travers and Audrey Morphett. The School was named after the village of Fahan (pronounced 'Fawn') in Inishowen in County Donegal in Ulster, Ireland. The School has a non-selective enrolment policy and currently caters for approximately 430 students from Pre–Kindergarten (PK) to Year 12,

Fahan School is a member of the Junior School Heads Association of Australia (JSHAA), the Association of Heads of Independent Schools of Australia (AHISA), and the Association of Independent Schools' of Tasmania (AIST).

Campus
Fahan School is located on a single campus with grounds overlooking the River Derwent, in the suburb of Sandy Bay.

Co-curriculum
The Fahan School has a number of sister schools around the world, Fintona (Australia), Joggakan (Tokyo) and St Mary's (South Africa). The school works closely with The Hutchins School in Sandy Bay, Tasmania - with senior students able to study across both campuses.

Sport
The Fahan School is a member of the Sports Association of Tasmanian Independent Schools (SATIS). Each year Fahan fields teams in a variety of sports. Students may compete for their House and School in sports such as: athletics, badminton, basketball, cross country, equestrian, hockey, netball, rowing, sailing, soccer, softball, tennis, and water polo.

SATIS premierships 
The Fahan School has won the following SATIS premierships.

 Athletics (3) - 1983, 1986, 2017
Cross Country - 2010
 Hockey (2) - 1986, 1988
 Soccer - 2016
 Softball (2) - 1983, 2003
 Tennis - 1993

House system
The Fahan School has three house systems; Fenton, Franklin or Freycinet. The houses form the basis of the pastoral care program in the Senior School, and also support competition across all sections of the school. Students compete for trophies in a variety of sports as well as academic application.

Notable alumnae
The Fahan School alumnae are active within the school community through the Fahan School Alumni Association (FSAA), formerly known as the Old Scholars Association. Some notable alumnae include:

Academia and sciences
Patricia Marea Bale-Hirst AM – Histopathologist, former head of the Histopathology Department at the Royal Alexandra Hospital for Children and Assistant Director of Morbid Anatomy at Sydney Hospital
Kimbra Cameron Boyer – Rural health academic and former Acting Chancellor of the University of Tasmania
Margaret M. Davies – Herpetologist
Ann Hollingworth – Physiotherapist and wife of Peter Hollingworth, 23rd Governor-General of Australia
Sally Poncet – Antarctic scientist and adventurer, winner of the Polar Medal

Business
Deborah Tabart OAM – chief executive officer of the Australian Koala Foundation

Entertainment, media and the arts
Judith Mavis Durham AO – Actress, singer, composer, pianist and author, former lead singer for the popular folk music group The Seekers and Australian of the Year (1967)
Posie Graeme-Evans – Novelist, producer, television director and co-creator of Hi-5 and McLeod's Daughters.
Zehra Naqvi – Actress
Robyn Nevin AM – Actress and former Artistic Director of the Sydney Theatre Company
Rachael Treasure – Journalist and author

Government, politics and the law
Elise Archer – Liberal politician, lawyer and Attorney-General of Tasmania
Olivia McTaggart – Tasmanian magistrate and coroner

International law and diplomacy
Dr Alice Edwards, Head of the Secretariat for the Convention against Torture Initiative and former Chief of Protection Policy and Legal Advice, at the United Nations High Commissioner for Refugees (2010-2015)

See also
List of schools in Tasmania
List of boarding schools

References

Further reading
 Winter, Gillian.(1981) Fahan 1935-1980 West Hobart: G. Winter.
 Winter, Gillian.(1995) Sixty years of endeavour, Fahan 1935-1995Sandy Bay, Tas. : Fahan School, 1995.

External links
The Fahan School website

Girls' schools in Tasmania
Educational institutions established in 1935
High schools in Hobart
Nondenominational Christian schools in Hobart
Junior School Heads Association of Australia Member Schools
Boarding schools in Tasmania
1935 establishments in Australia
Sandy Bay, Hobart
Alliance of Girls' Schools Australasia